The National Republican Association – Colorado Party (Spanish: Asociación Nacional Republicana – Partido Colorado, ANR-PC) is a right-wing political party in Paraguay, founded on 11 September 1887, by Bernardino Caballero. The party was defeated in 2008 after 61 years in power, but the party regained the presidency in the 2013 election. With almost 2 million members, it is the largest political party in the country.

History

1887–1989
It initially ruled the country from 1887 until 1904. In 1946, it rejoined the government, together with the Febreristas, during Higinio Moríñigo's rule as President of Paraguay.

From 1947 until 1962, the Colorado Party ruled Paraguay as a one-party state; all other political parties were illegal. In 1962, all national parties were nominally legalized; the Communist Party being deemed "international" remained illegal and its adherents repressed by the Paraguayan state. During the rule of Alfredo Stroessner all members of the armed forces and government employees were required to be members of the Colorado Party. In 1987, there was a rift in the party between a hardliner faction supportive of Stroessner and a traditionalist faction. This rift was primarily over the issue of Stroessner's succession and was a large contributor to the 1989 coup d'état led by General Andrés Rodríguez, himself a traditionalist.

In practice, however, Paraguay remained a one-party military dictatorship until Stroessner's overthrow in 1989. It served as one of the "twin pillars" of Stroessner's 35-year rule, one of the longest in history by a non-royal leader.

Since 1989
In 2002, the National Union of Ethical Citizens split from the party.

At the legislative elections of 27 April 2003, the party won 35.3% of the popular vote (37 out of 80 seats) in the Chamber of Deputies of Paraguay and 32.9% (16 out of 45 seats) in the Senate. Its candidate at the presidential elections on the same day, Nicanor Duarte, won 37.1% of the popular vote and was elected President of Paraguay.

Originally, the Colorado Party was conservative, representing those opposed to the Liberal Party.

On 20 April 2008, for the first time in 61 years, the Colorado Party lost the presidential elections to an opposition candidate from the center-left, Fernando Lugo, a Roman Catholic bishop, a first on both accounts (free election of an opposition candidate and of a bishop to the office of president in Paraguay). The Colorado Party was represented in these elections by Blanca Ovelar, the first woman to run for the presidency. Fernando Lugo, who had renounced the cloth before the elections so that he could become eligible under Paraguayan law, was formally released from his vows by the Vatican before his installation as president on 15 August 2008.

According to Antonio Soljancic, a social scientist at the Autonomous University of Asunción, "in order to get a job, you had to show you were a party member. The problem Paraguay has is that, although Stroessner disappeared from the political map, he left a legacy that no one has tried to bury".

Electoral history

Presidential elections 
Note: From 1947 until 1962, the Colorado Party was the sole legal party. Free and fair elections did not take place until 1993.

Vice presidential election

Chamber of Deputies elections 
Note: From 1947 until 1962, the Colorado Party was the sole legal party. Free and fair elections did not take place until 1993.

Senate elections 
Note: free and fair elections did not take place until 1993.

References

External links

ANR – Partido Colorado

1887 establishments in Paraguay
Conservative parties in South America
International Democrat Union member parties
Paraguayan nationalism
National conservative parties
Neoliberal parties
Parties of one-party systems
Political history of Paraguay
Political parties established in 1887
Political parties in Paraguay
Anti-communist parties